Iver Andreas Horrem (born 1 January 1977 in Aukra) is a Norwegian professional beach volleyball player from Norway, best known as Bjørn Maaseide's teammate. He also plays volleyball for Kristiansund VBK.

Playing career

Career start
Horrem has played on a professional level since 1999. He first became Bjørn Maaseide's teammate when Maaseide's former partner Jan Kvalheim retired after the 2000 Summer Olympics in Sydney. Horrem og Maaseide played four seasons together (2001–2004), with four 5. place finishes in the World Tour as their best result. The duo also came fifth in the 2004 European Championships and ended their career together with a 19. place in the 2004 Summer Olympics in Athens.

New partner
When Maaseide retired after the 2004 Summer Olympics, Horrem played two seasons with Bård Inge Pettersen. They achieved two fifth-place finishes in the World Tour as their best result.

Maaseide's comeback
In the winter of 2007, Horrem og Pettersen split up and Horrem challenged Maaseide to a comeback. After some consideration, Maaseide decided to start playing again. The reunited duo made their debut in a World Tour competition in Shanghai, and finished with a thirteenth place.

Playing partners
 Bjørn Maaseide (2001–2004)
 Bård Inge Pettersen (2005–2006)
 Bjørn Maaseide (2007–present)

References

External links
 

1977 births
Living people
People from Aukra
Norwegian beach volleyball players
Norwegian men's volleyball players
Beach volleyball players at the 2004 Summer Olympics
Olympic beach volleyball players of Norway
Sportspeople from Møre og Romsdal
Men's beach volleyball players